Al Stewart (born 1945) is a Glasgow-born English singer-songwriter and musician.

Al Stewart may also refer to:
 Alastair Stewart (born 1952), English journalist and newscaster
 Al Stewart (bishop) (born 1959), Australian bishop
 Al Stewart (basketball) (born 1959), American basketball player
Al Stewart (U.S. government official), U.S. Department of Labor official

See also
Alan Stewart (disambiguation)
Albert Stewart (disambiguation)